The Coppermine River Group is a sequence of Mesoproterozoic continental flood basalts forming part of the Mackenzie Large Igneous Province in the Northwest Territories and Nunavut, Canada.

Eruptive history
The Coppermine River Group was formed when vast volumes of basaltic lava paved over a large area of the northwestern Canadian Shield about 1,267 million years ago. Except for the lowermost flows, which contain evidence of interaction with water, the entire sequence was erupted subaerially. Eruption of plateau lavas near the Coppermine River, built an extensive volcanic plateau about 1,200 million years ago with an area of about  representing a volume of lavas of at least . These flood basalts have been interpreted as contemporaneous with the giant Mackenzie dike swarm and with the Muskox intrusion.

See also
Natkusiak flood basalts
Volcanology of Canada
Volcanology of Northern Canada

References

Volcanism of the Northwest Territories
Mesoproterozoic volcanism
Hotspot volcanism
Mackenzie Large Igneous Province